Anne Wilma Adams (born 30 January 1960) is a female former swimmer who represented Great Britain and Wales.

Swimming career
Adams competed in two events at the 1976 Summer Olympics. She represented Wales at both the 1974 British Commonwealth Games in Christchurch, New Zealand.and the 1978 Commonwealth Games in Edmonton, Alberta, Canada. At the ASA National British Championships she won the 200 metres medley title in 1975  and the 400 metres medley title in 1975.

References

External links
 

1960 births
Living people
British female swimmers
Welsh female swimmers
Olympic swimmers of Great Britain
Swimmers at the 1976 Summer Olympics
Sportspeople from Bridgend
Swimmers at the 1974 British Commonwealth Games
Swimmers at the 1978 Commonwealth Games
Commonwealth Games competitors for Wales